Microgravity Experiment Research Locker/Incubator (MERLIN) was designed by University of Alabama at Birmingham (UAB) Center for Biophysical Sciences and Engineering (CBSE) to operate as a hardmounted, single middeck locker equivalent within the ISS EXPRESS rack, the Space Shuttle, SpaceX Dragon, and Cygnus (spacecraft) . It is used to provide a temperature controlled environment for scientific experiments between -20 °C and 48.5 °C. MERLIN is also used to Support Crew Galley Operations.

Description
MERLIN is cooled using Thermoelectric elements, and can be cooled to -20 °C while using ISS water supply or -10 °C while only being air cooled. Resistive heating elements are used to provide an incubation capacity up to 48.5 °C.
MERLIN contains temperature sensor connections inside the payload volume, for monitoring sample temperature, for up to 12 sensors.
The internal sample volume  is ~.

Additional Cold Stowage
MERLIN is one of multiple units available for storage on the ISS and/or transportation to and from the ISS.
Minus Eighty Degree Laboratory Freezer for ISS (MELFI)
 +4 °C to -80 °C
GLACIER (General Laboratory Active Cryogenic ISS Experiment Refrigerator)
 +4 °C to –160 °C
Polar (Research Refrigerator for ISS)''' 
 +4 °C to -95 °C

See also
Scientific research on the ISS
International Space Station
SpaceX Dragon

References

Space science experiments
University of Alabama at Birmingham
Cooling technology